John McEnroe defeated Chris Lewis in the final, 6–2, 6–2, 6–2 to win the gentlemen's singles tennis title at the 1983 Wimbledon Championships. It was his second Wimbledon singles title and fifth major singles title overall.

Jimmy Connors was the defending champion, but lost in the fourth round to Kevin Curren. Lewis became the first New Zealander to reach a major singles final in the open era.

Seeds

  Jimmy Connors (fourth round)
  John McEnroe (champion)
  Ivan Lendl (semifinals)
  Guillermo Vilas (first round)
  Mats Wilander (third round)
  Gene Mayer (withdrew)
  José Luis Clerc (first round)
  Vitas Gerulaitis (second round)
  Steve Denton (first round)
  Jimmy Arias (withdrew)
  Johan Kriek (third round)
  Kevin Curren (semifinals)
  Brian Gottfried (fourth round)
  Bill Scanlon (fourth round)
  Hank Pfister (second round)
  Tim Mayotte (quarterfinals)

Gene Mayer and Jimmy Arias withdrew due to injury. They were replaced in the draw by lucky loser Bruce Kleege and Qualifier Scott Davis respectively.

Qualifying

Draw

Finals

Top half

Section 1

Section 2

Section 3

Section 4

Bottom half

Section 5

Section 6

Section 7

Section 8

References

External links

 1983 Wimbledon Championships – Men's draws and results at the International Tennis Federation

Men's Singles
Wimbledon Championship by year – Men's singles